The women's 4 × 400 metres relay at the 2011 Asian Athletics Championships was held at the Kobe Universiade Memorial Stadium on 10 July.

The Kazakhstan and Iraq 4×400 m relay quartets (second and third initially) were later disqualified after Kazakhstan's Olga Tereshkova and Iraq's Gulustan Ieso tested positive for testosterone and methylhexaneamine, respectively. The Indian team were promoted to silver medallists and the bronze was vacated as only four teams participated.

Results

References
Results

Relay 4x400
Relays at the Asian Athletics Championships
2011 in women's athletics